Bradford Area High School is a public high school providing grades 9-12. It is located in Bradford, Pennsylvania, in the north central region of the Commonwealth. The current principal is David Ray. In the 2016–2017 school year the enrollment was 776.The demographics of the students body are: 95% of the students are white, while 1% are black, 1% are Hispanic, 1% are Asian and 2% are American Indian.

Extracurriculars
The district offers a variety of clubs, activities and sports.

Athletics
Bradford Area participates in PIAA District IX (9)

The athletics program has produced two known professional baseball players, Ben Copeland and Zachary Foster. The athletics program excels in their region and has graduated numerous athletes that have signed National Letters of Intent to play NCAA Division II and III sports at prestigious universities.

Notable alumni
 Stew Barber, former NFL player
 Hank Goodman, former NFL player
 Larry Peace, former NFL player
 Art Stevenson, former NFL player
 Jigs Ullery, former NFL player
 Jim Owens, former MLB player

References

Public high schools in Pennsylvania
Schools in McKean County, Pennsylvania